Songs from the Labyrinth is the eighth studio album by British singer-songwriter Sting. On this album, he collaborates with Bosnian lutenist Edin Karamazov. The album features music by John Dowland (1563–1626), a lutenist and songwriter. It entered the UK Official Albums Chart at #24 and reached #25 on the Billboard 200, strong charting peaks for a classical record on the pop album charts. The release was a slow seller for a Sting album, his first since 1986's Bring on the Night to fail to break the UK top 10.

The album was released and re-released in several versions: LP vinyl and CD editions with 23 tracks, a CD/DVD edition with 8 tracks on the CD and a DVD documentary, The Journey and the Labyrinth (released in both "CD size" and "DVD size" packaging), and a CD re-release with 26 tracks (including live versions of Sting's own "Fields of Gold" and "Message in a Bottle", originally recorded with The Police). In late August 2013, a "Dowland Anniversary Edition" was released, which includes 32 tracks on one CD (the full original album, six live versions of album tracks and Sting's non-Dowland live songs), as well as a DVD with the original documentary.

Track listing
For the original CD program, the music was that of the 16th century British composer John Dowland, except for "Have You Seen the Bright Lily Grow", a song by Dowland's contemporary Robert Johnson. The 2008 re-release adds two live recordings of Sting-penned songs performed on lutes, as well as a live recording, in the same style, of "Hellhound on My Trail" by another Robert Johnson - the Delta blues musician, and an alternate version of "Have You Seen the Bright Lily Grow". The latter is omitted from the 2013 "Dowland Anniversary Edition" of the album, which, however, includes all of the live recordings. The track list includes readings from a letter by Dowland to Robert Cecil, 1st Earl of Salisbury.
The lyrics to many of Dowland's songs are anonymous.

 "Walsingham" – 0:38 [instrumental]
 "Can She Excuse My Wrongs" [lyrics attributed to Robert Devereux, 2nd Earl of Essex] – 2:35
 "Ryght Honorable..." – 0:40 [letter to Robert Cecil, 1st Earl of Salisbury]
 "Flow My Tears (Lachrimae)" – 4:42
 "Have You Seen the Bright Lily Grow" – 2:35 [lyrics: Ben Jonson, music: Robert Johnson]
 "...Then in Time Passing On..." – 0:32 [continuation of letter]
 "The Battle Galliard" – 3:01
 "The Lowest Trees Have Tops" [lyrics by Sir Edward Dyer] – 2:16
 "... And Accordinge as I Desired Ther Cam a Letter..." – 0:55 [continuation of letter]
 "Fine Knacks for Ladies" – 1:50
 "...From Thence I Went to Landgrave of Hessen..." – 0:24 [continuation of letter]
 "Fantasy" – 2:42
 "Come, Heavy Sleep" – 3:46
 "Forlorn Hope Fancy" – 3:08
 "...And from Thence I Had Great Desire to See Italy..." – 0:28 [continuation of letter]
 "Come Again" – 2:56
 "Wilt Thou Unkind Thus Reave Me" – 2:40
 "...After My Departures I Caled to Mynde..." – 0:30 [continuation of letter]
 "Weep You No More, Sad Fountains" – 2:38
 "My Lord Willoughby's Welcome Home" – 1:34
 "Clear or Cloudy" – 2:47
 "...Men Say That the Kinge of Spain..." – 1:01 [continuation of letter]
 "In Darkness Let Me Dwell" – 4:12
 "Flow My Tears [live at St Luke Old Street - bonus track on 2013 "Dowland Anniversary Edition"]
 "The Lowest Trees Have Tops"  [live at St Luke Old Street - bonus track on 2013 "Dowland Anniversary Edition"]
 "Fantasy"  [Edin Karamazov solo, live at St Luke Old Street - bonus track on 2013 "Dowland Anniversary Edition"]
 "Come Again"  [live at St Luke Old Street - bonus track on 2013 "Dowland Anniversary Edition"]
 "Have You Seen the Bright Lily Grow"  [live at St Luke Old Street - bonus track on 2013 "Dowland Anniversary Edition"]
 "In Darkness Let Me Dwell"  [live at St Luke Old Street - bonus track on 2013 "Dowland Anniversary Edition"]
 "Hellhound on My Trail" [ Robert Johnson ] [live at St Luke Old Street - bonus track on re-release and on 2013 "Dowland Anniversary Edition"]
 "Fields of Gold" – 3:34 [Sting] [live at St Luke Old Street - bonus track on re-release and on 2013 "Dowland Anniversary Edition"]
 "Message in a Bottle" – 5:40 [Sting] [live at St Luke Old Street - bonus track on re-release and on 2013 "Dowland Anniversary Edition"]
 The 2008 re-release features an alternate version of "Have You Seen the Bright Lily Grow", as track 26, but does not include the six live versions of Dowland songs.

Related live album and documentary

Disc 1: CD   
 "Flow My Tears (Lachrimae)"
 "The Lowest Trees Have Tops"
 "Fantasy"
 "Come Again"
 "Have You Seen the Bright Lily Grow"
 "In Darkness Let Me Dwell"
 "Hell Hound on My Trail" [a Robert Johnson cover]
 "Message in a Bottle" [written by Sting; originally recorded by the Police]

Disc 2: DVD Documentary with rehearsal and concert footage. The "tracks" listed below are the DVD chapter stops. 
 "Come Again"
 Project Origin
 "Can She Excuse My Wrongs"
 The Lute and the Labyrinth
 "The Lowest Trees Have Tops"
 "Flow My Tears"
 Dowland's Exile
 "Clear or Cloudy"
 Political Intrigue
 "Have You Seen The Bright Lily Grow"
 "Weep You No More Sad Fountains"
 "Le Rossignol"
 Religion
 Sting and the Lute
 "Come, Heavy Sleep"
 "In Darkness Let Me Dwell"

Charts

Weekly charts

Certifications

References

2006 classical albums
Sting (musician) albums